51 Eridani is a star in the constellation Eridanus. It has an apparent magnitude of 5.22, meaning it is just visible to the unaided eye in suburban and rural skies. The primary star's absolute magnitude is 2.87. There is also a binary star named GJ 3305 which shares the same proper motion through space with it, making it overall a triple star system.

General information
Johann Bayer gave the star its Bayer designation of c Eridani, using lowercase letters once he had exhausted all the letters of the Greek alphabet, in his 1603 star chart Uranometria. It was catalogued as 51 Eridani by John Flamsteed in 1725.

A cold debris disk has been detected with a likely inner border of 82 astronomical units (AU). A yellow-white main-sequence star of spectral type F0V, 51 Eridani is a member of the Beta Pictoris moving group and hence thought to be around 23 million years old. Somewhat more luminous than it should be for its surface temperature, 51 Eridani has also been classified as spectral type F0IV—a type corresponding to ageing stars that have used up their core hydrogen fuel and become subgiants; however, in this case it is a phenomenon of very young stars 5 to 30 million years old that have yet to settle on the main sequence.

Photometric measurements with the TESS space telescope show that this is a Gamma Doradus-like pulsating star. Nine pulsation frequencies have been detected.

GJ 3305 
51 Eridani has a companion, known as GJ 3305. The system has a common proper motion with 51 Eridani, and hence it is gravitationally bound, although it is separated by 66″ corresponding to 2,000 AU. It is a binary star system with two M-type red dwarfs. The two red dwarfs themselves are separated by a semimajor axis of 9.78 ± 0.14 AU and have an eccentricity of 0.19 ± 0.02.

The star is significant as the host sun to one of the first planets to have been directly imaged in wide-orbit, and the first detected by the Gemini Planet Imager.

Planetary system
51 Eridani b is a young Jupiter-like planet and was photographed, in near-infrared light, on 21 December 2014. The study, led by Bruce Macintosh, a professor of physics at Stanford University and confirmed by Christian Marois found that methane and water were abundant in the atmosphere of the planet and its mass was only slightly larger than Jupiter's. It is the smallest exoplanet directly imaged to date. The planetary orbit was found to be significantly eccentric by 2019.

Gaia astrometry also suggests an additional planet on orbit smaller than 51 Eridani b.

References

Cited text

 

F-type subgiants
Triple star systems
Beta Pictoris moving group
Planetary systems with one confirmed planet

Eridanus (constellation)
Eridani, c
1474
BD-02 963
Eridani, 51
021547
029391
J04373613-0228248